Walter Hahn was a German football manager who managed the Lithuania for six matches between 1939 and 1940.

Career
Hahn was the manager of the Lithuania between 1939 and 1940. He was in charge of six matches, and finished with a record of three wins, one draw and two losses.

Managerial statistics

References

External links
 

Year of birth missing
Year of death missing
German football managers
Lithuania national football team managers